The   is a Japanese multinational pharmaceutical company, with partial American and British roots. It is the largest pharmaceutical company in Asia and one of the top 20 largest pharmaceutical companies in the world by revenue (top 10 following its merger with Shire). The company has over 49,578 employees worldwide and achieved US$19.299 billion in revenue during the 2018 fiscal year. The company is focused on oncology, rare diseases, neuroscience, gastroenterology, plasma-derived therapies and vaccines. Its headquarters is located in Chuo-ku, Osaka, and it has an office in Nihonbashi, Chuo, Tokyo. In January 2012, Fortune Magazine ranked the Takeda Oncology Company as one of the 100 best companies to work for in the United States. As of 2015, Christophe Weber was appointed as the CEO and president of Takeda.

History

Founding and initial acquisitions (1781-2010) 

Takeda Pharmaceuticals was founded in 1781, and was incorporated on January 29, 1925.

One of the firm's mainstay drugs is Actos (pioglitazone), a compound in the thiazolidinedione class of drugs used in the treatment of type 2 diabetes. It was launched in 1999.

In February 2005, Takeda acquired San Diego, California, based Syrrx, a company specializing in high-throughput X-ray crystallography, for US$270 million.

In February 2008, Takeda acquired the Japanese operations of Amgen and rights to a dozen of the California biotechnology company's pipeline candidates for the Japanese market.  In April, Takeda acquired Millennium Pharmaceuticals of Cambridge, Massachusetts, a company specializing in cancer drug research, for US$8.8 billion. The acquisition brought in Velcade, a drug indicated for hematological malignancies, as well as a portfolio of pipeline candidates in the oncology, inflammation, and cardiovascular therapeutic areas. Millennium now operates as an independent subsidiary. In May, the company licensed non-exclusively the RNAi technology platform developed by Alnylam Pharmaceuticals, creating a potentially long-term partnership between the companies.

Further expansion and research (2011-present) 
In September 2011, Takeda acquired Nycomed for €9.6 billion.

In May 2012, Takeda purchased Brazilian pharmaceutical company Multilab for R$540 million. In June, Takeda announced it would acquire URL Pharma, then run by the founder's son Richard Roberts, for US$800 million.

In September 2014, Takeda announced it would team up with BioMotiv to identify and develop new compounds over a five-year period, worth approximately US$25 million. On 30 September 2014, Takeda announced it would expand a collaboration with MacroGenics, valued up to US$1.6 billion. The collaboration focused on the co-development of the preclinical autoimmune compound MGD010. MGD010 is a therapy which targets the B-cell surface proteins CD32B and CD79B, and is indicated for lupus and rheumatoid arthritis.

In 2015, Takeda sold its respiratory drugs business to AstraZeneca for $575 million (about £383 million), which included roflumilast and ciclesonide. On November, the U.S. Food and Drug Administration approved Ixazomib developed by Takeda for use in combination with lenalidomide and dexamethasone for the treatment of multiple myeloma after at least one prior therapy.

In December 2016, the company spun out its neuroscience research division into Cerevance, a joint venture along with Lightstone Ventures.

In February 2017, Takeda acquired Ariad Pharmaceuticals for $5.2 billion, expanding the company's oncology and hematology divisions.

In January 2018, the company acquired stem cell therapy developer TiGenix for up to €520 million ($632 million).

In October, Takeda announced it had sold a portfolio of over-the-counter and prescription medicines in the Middle East and Africa to Swiss pharmaceuticals company Acino International for more than $200 million.

In January 2020, Takeda announced a research partnership with the Massachusetts Institute of Technology (MIT) to advance discoveries in artificial intelligence and health. The MIT-Takeda Program is housed in the MIT Jameel Clinic, and is led by Professor James J. Collins, with a steering committee led by Professor Anantha P. Chandrakasan, dean of the MIT School of Engineering, and Anne Heatherington, senior vice president and head of Data Sciences Institute (DSI) at Takeda. In March 2020, Takeda announced that it has entered into an exclusive agreement to divest a portfolio of non-core products in Latin America to Hypera S.A. for a total value of $825 million.

In March 2021, the company announced it would acquire Maverick Therapeutics, Inc. and its two major programs TAK-186 (MVC-101) in trials for the treatment of EGFR-expressing tumours and TAK-280 (MVC-280) for use in the treatment of patients with B7H3-expressing tumors. In October, they acquired GammaDelta Therapeutics and its gamma delta (γδ) T cell immunotherapy programme.

In January 2022, Takeda announced it would exercise its option to acquire Adaptate Biotherapeutics and its antibody-based γδ T cell technology, reuniting Adaptate and its former parent company, GammaDelta Therapeutics, in a single organisation. In December of the same year, the company announced it would acquire Nimbus Lakshmi, Inc. and its lead compound NDI-034858 which is an allosteric TYK2 inhibitor, from Nimbus Therapeutics, LLC for up to $6 billion.

TAP Pharmaceuticals (1977-2008) 

In 1977, Takeda first entered the U.S. pharmaceutical market by developing a joint venture with Abbott Laboratories called TAP Pharmaceuticals. Through TAP Pharmaceuticals Takeda and Abbott launched blockbuster drugs Lupron (leuprorelin), in 1985, then Prevacid (lansoprazole), in 1995.

In 2001, TAP's illegal marketing of Lupron resulted in both civil and criminal charges by the U.S. Department of Justice and the Illinois attorney general for federal and state medicare fraud. TAP was fined $875 million, then reported as the largest pharmaceutical settlement in history.

In March 2008, Takeda and Abbott Laboratories announced plans to conclude their 30-year-old joint venture, TAP Pharmaceuticals. The split resulted in Abbott acquiring U.S. rights to Lupron and the drug's support staff. Takeda received rights to Prevacid and TAP's pipeline candidates. The move also increased Takeda's headcount by 3,000 employees.

Acquisition history 

Takeda Pharmaceutical Company (Est. 1781)
Syrrx (Acq 2005)
Millennium Pharmaceuticals (Acq 2008)
COR Therapeutics (Acq 2002)
Cambridge Discovery Chemistry (Acq 2000)
Leukosite (Acq 1999)
Nycomed (Acq 2011)
Altana Pharma (Pharmaceuticals div, Acq 2007)
Bradley Pharmaceuticals (Acq 2007)
URL Pharma (Acq 2012)
Multilaba (Acq 2012)
Cerevance (Neuroscience div, Spun off 2016)
Ariad Pharmaceuticals (Acq 2017)
TiGenix (Acq 2018)
Shire plc (Founded 1986, Acq 2019)
Pharmavene (Acq 1997)
Richwood Pharmaceutical Company (Acq 1997)
Biochem Canada (Acq 2001)
Transkaryotic Therapeutics (Acq 2005)
New River Pharmaceuticals Inc (Acq 2007)
Jerini (Acq 2008)
Movetis (Acq 2012)
Advanced BioHealing (Acq 2011)
FerroKin BioSciences (Acq 2012)
Lotus Tissue Repair, Inc (Acq 2013)
Premacure AB (Acq 2013)
SARcode Bioscience Inc (Acq 2013)
ViroPharma (Founded 1994, Acq 2013)
Lev Pharmaceuticals (Acq 2008)
Fibrotech (Acq 2014)
Lumena (Acq 2014)
NPS Pharmaceuticals (Acq 2015)
Meritage Pharma (Acq 2015)
Foresight Biotherapeutics (Acq 2015)
Dyax (Acq 2015)
Baxalta (Acq 2016)
PvP Biologics, Inc. (Acq 2020)
Maverick Therapeutics, Inc. (Acq 2021)
GammaDelta Therapeutics (Acq 2021)
Adaptate Biotherapeutics (Acq 2022)
Nimbus Lakshmi, Inc. (Acq 2022)

Divestments 
In May 2019, Takeda sold its Xiidra dry-eye drug business to Novartis for $5.3 billion, $3.4 billion upfront and up-to $1.9 billion in sales milestones.

In November 2019, Takeda entered an agreement to sell its over-the-counter and prescription drugs businesses in Russia, Georgia, Armenia, Azerbaijan, Belarus, Kazakhstan, and Uzbekistan to Stada Arzneimittel for $660 million.

In June 2020, Takeda announced that it was divesting 18 over-the-counter and prescription drugs marketed in the Asia-Pacific region to South Korea's Celltrion in a deal worth $278 million.

Locations 
Takeda operates two primary bases in Japan in Osaka and Tokyo. Its United States subsidiary is based in Cambridge, Massachusetts, and all Global Operations outside Japan and the U.K. are based in Opfikon (Zurich), Switzerland.
The company maintains research and development sites in Japan, the United States, the United Kingdom and Singapore, with manufacturing facilities across the globe.

Lawsuits 
In April 2015 Takeda agreed to pay a settlement of $2.37 billion to an estimated 9,000 people who submitted claims alleging that pioglitazone was responsible for giving them bladder cancer. The company said the decision is expected to resolve the “vast majority” of these cases. Takeda will put the money into a settlement fund if 95 percent of plaintiffs agree to the accord, according to which each claimant would get an average $267,000. However, the exact amount for each plaintiff will be evaluated based on cumulative dosage, extent of injuries and history of smoking.  In 2014, a plaintiff was awarded $9 billion in punitive damages after a federal court found Takeda hid the cancer risks of their diabetes medicine, but the amount was later reduced to $26 million by a judge who deemed the charge excessive.

Public-private engagement

Activism 
Takeda is a corporate partner of Human Rights Campaign, a large LGBT advocacy organization.

References

External links

 
 

 
Companies listed on the Tokyo Stock Exchange
Companies listed on the Fukuoka Stock Exchange
Companies listed on the Nagoya Stock Exchange
Companies listed on the New York Stock Exchange
Japanese companies established in 1781
Manufacturing companies based in Osaka
Multinational companies headquartered in Japan
Orphan drug companies
Pharmaceutical companies established in 1781
Pharmaceutical companies of Japan
1940s initial public offerings